João Batista Casemiro Marques (born 4 March 1975) is a former professional footballer who played the majority of his career in Turkey.

Career
He also played for Gaziantepspor, Galatasaray, Konyaspor in Turkey and Shakhtar Donetsk in Ukraine.

Personal
He has dual Turkish citizenship with Mertol Karatay name on his passport.

International career
Having not been capped by his native Brazil, Batista had the option of playing for Turkey if called up as Mehmet Aurélio. He was one of favourite player for Fatih Terim when he played for Galatasaray.

References

External links
 

Sportspeople from Minas Gerais
1975 births
Living people
Turkish footballers
Brazilian footballers
Galatasaray S.K. footballers
Konyaspor footballers
Gaziantepspor footballers
União São João Esporte Clube players
FC Shakhtar Donetsk players
Brazilian emigrants to Turkey
Turkish people of Brazilian descent
Brazilian expatriate footballers
Brazilian expatriate sportspeople in Turkey
Expatriate footballers in Turkey
Expatriate footballers in Ukraine
Süper Lig players
Ukrainian Premier League players
Naturalized citizens of Turkey
Brazilian expatriate sportspeople in Ukraine
Association football midfielders
Converts to Islam